Phymateus is a genus of grasshoppers of the family Pyrgomorphidae.

Description
Some species at maturity are capable of long migratory flights. They raise and rustle wings when disturbed and may secrete a noxious fluid from the thoracic joint. These locusts feed on highly toxic plants and usually congregate in large numbers on trees and shrubs, arranged in such a way as to resemble foliage. Females of the species Phymateus morbillosus are unable to fly, despite fully developed wings.

Distribution
Species of this genus can be found in Southern, Central and East Africa, through Somalia and Madagascar to India.

List of species
The Orthoptera Species File lists:
subgenus Maphyteus Bolívar, 1904
 Phymateus baccatus Stål, 1876
 Phymateus leprosus (Fabricius, 1793)
subgenus Phymateus Thunberg, 1815
 Phymateus aegrotus (Gerstaecker, 1869)
 Phymateus bolivari Kirby, 1910
 Phymateus cinctus (Fabricius, 1793)synonyms: P. stolli (Saussure, 1861) = P. flavus (I. Bolivar, 1903) = P. squarrosus (Houttuyn, 1813)
 Phymateus iris Bolívar, 1882
 Phymateus karschi Bolívar, 1904
 Phymateus madagassus Karsch, 1888
 Phymateus morbillosus (Linnaeus, 1758) = type species (as Gryllus morbillosus L.)
 Phymateus pulcherrimus (I. Bolívar, 1904)
 Phymateus saxosus (Coquerel, 1862)
 Phymateus viridipes Stål, 1873

Gallery

References

External links

Pyrgomorphidae
Caelifera genera
Taxa named by Carl Peter Thunberg